List of rivers flowing in Kalimantan, which is Indonesian portion of the island of Borneo, comprising 73% of the island's area.

In alphabetical order

By Province

Central Kalimantan

East Kalimantan

North Kalimantan

South Kalimantan

West Kalimantan

See also
 List of rivers of Indonesia

References

 
Kalimantan
Kalimantan